Plessey railway station served the hamlet of Plessey, Northumberland, England from 1859 to 1962 on the East Coast Main Line.

History 
The station opened in July 1859, which was when it first appeared in the Bradshaw timetable. It was situated northwest of the level crossing on Shotton Lane. In the early versions of the timetable it was spelled as 'Plessy' and 'Plessay' but in 1864 and onwards it was spelled Plessey. There were two sidings at the station; one had a trailing junction with the up line southeast of the level crossing, the other was northwest of the level crossing and had a training junction with the down line with a headshunt. The station was closed to passengers on 15 September 1958 along with many other minor stations on the line and closed completely on 2 April 1962 when goods traffic ceased.

References

External links 

Disused railway stations in Northumberland
Former North Eastern Railway (UK) stations
Railway stations in Great Britain opened in 1859
Railway stations in Great Britain closed in 1958
1859 establishments in England
1962 disestablishments in England
Cramlington